This is a list of South African television related events from 2008.

Events
20 March - Erfsondes actor Emmanuel Castis and his partner Lindsey Muckle win the fourth season of Strictly Come Dancing.
1 July - South African television launches a Nickelodeon channel of its own for the very first time. The channel includes many of Nickelodeon's famous shows including the Nicktoons that were most previously aired on its Nickelodeon block on K-T.V. World since 1999.
4 December - The Crazy Games presenter and comedian Rob van Vuuren and his partner Mary Martin win the fifth season of Strictly Come Dancing.

Debuts

Domestic
7 January - The Biggest Loser (e.tv) (2008)
27 January - Are You Smarter than a 5th Grader? (M-Net) (2008)

International
22 January -  Pushing Daisies (M-Net)
29 February -  Wizards of Waverly Place (Disney Channel)
3 March -  George of the Jungle (Cartoon Network)
5 March -  Samantha Who? (M-Net)
27 March -  Life (M-Net)
28 March - /// Animalia (SABC2)
5 May -  My Spy Family (Cartoon Network)
10 May - / Eliot Kid (Cartoon Network)
12 May -  Chowder (Cartoon Network)
2 June -  Army Wives (M-Net)
4 June -  Chuck (M-Net)
1 September - / Chop Socky Chooks (Cartoon Network)
4 September -  Home Salvage (The Home Channel)
4 September -  Total Drama Island (Cartoon Network)
29 September -  Lipstick Jungle (SABC3)
2 October -  Orange Roughies (Go)
26 November -  In Treatment (M-Net Series)
2 December -  Raising the Bar (M-Net)
 Bo on the Go! (M-Net)
 Roary the Racing Car (M-Net)
 The Beeps (M-Net)
 DinoSquad (M-Net)
/// The Tudors (M-Net)
 Being Ian (M-Net)

Changes of network affiliation

Television shows

1980s
Good Morning South Africa (1985–present)
Carte Blanche (1988–present)

1990s
Top Billing (1992–present)
Generations (1994–present)
Isidingo (1998–present)

2000s
Idols South Africa (2002–present)
Rhythm City (2007–present)

New channels
1 July - Nickelodeon

Ending this year
Strictly Come Dancing (2006-2008, 2013–2015)
Deal or No Deal (2007-2008)

Births

Deaths

See also
2008 in South Africa